The Accreditation in Public Relations (APR), Accreditation in Public Relations and Military Communications (APR+M), and Certificate in Principles of Public Relations are voluntary certifications in the USA for persons working in the field of public relations (PR) and, in the case of the APR+M, military public affairs. They are administered by the Universal Accreditation Board.

Overview

History
The APR credential was established in 1964 as a certification program sponsored by the Public Relations Society of America (PRSA). The PRSA continued to manage the program until 1998 when the Universal Accreditation Board - consisting of approximately 25 representatives from nine major PR professional societies - was formed as part of an effort to make the credential an industry-wide, instead of organization-specific, certification.
 Recognizing the value of having leaders who have earned the PR industry's credential and thus demonstrate their knowledge of and commitment to the principles of the profession, members voted to retain the APR as a requirement for certain PRSA national leadership positions.
The Universal Accreditation Board meets quarterly to approve recent APRs and oversee all aspects of the APR process. It regularly updates the two-step assessment process (Panel Presentation and computer-based Examination) to ensure it is assessing relevant PR knowledge, skills and abilities. 

In 2009, the UAB added the APR+M, an enhanced credential for military public affairs professionals. In 2014, UAB launched the Certificate in Principles of Public Relations, designed for graduating seniors to benchmark their knowledge of the field and enter the pipeline for pursuing the APR after attaining some years of professional experience.

A comprehensive timeline of major events in the APRs history was compiled as part of the credential's 50th Anniversary in 2014, as well as a white paper describing its history in more detail (see External Links).

Support and criticism 
The APR certification has been endorsed by some in the PR industry who feel it establishes a clear indicator of competence for those who possess it, separating "the contenders from the pretenders." A 2005 survey found that accredited PR practitioners earn, on average, 20-percent more than those who lack accreditation.

According to a 2013 study of the APR by OPG (Organizational Performance Group), all the credentials they studied required certification to serve in leadership positions, validating PRSAs decision to maintain that requirement for some of its national leadership positions.

A 2003 textbook cites a survey of unaccredited PRSA members which found that 80-percent felt a sense of disenfranchisement from the organization as a result of preferences within the group given to those holding the APR. It also referenced feedback that the certification has  been criticized over the low number of APR candidates who are able to successfully complete the requirements to earn the credential. However, since that time the number of practitioners earning their APR each year has increased dramatically, ranging from 80 in 2004, 222 in 2009 and 179 in 2015. Some of the participating organizations "rebate" part of the fee to their members once they pass the computer-based Examination, bringing the cost to under $300. In 2019, 19 percent of all PRSA members are APR certified.

Future
In 2013, the UAB and PRSA began an internal review on how to enhance the relevance of the APR certification. An outside consulting firm retained to study the credential recommended an overhaul that would include third-party certification of the APR by an independent certifying body such as the American National Standards Institute, increased marketing of the credential to employers and the public, strengthening of continuing education requirements, opening the certification to persons other than members of UAB affiliated organizations, and the creation of an entry-level credential. In 2014, the UAB launched a nationwide campaign celebrating the APRs 50th anniversary, and in 2016 the UAB launched a campaign to promote awareness and value of the APR, called "It Takes A PRo." The UAB added two new participating organizations in 2016 and 2017, which expanded the pool of public relations professionals who can pursue the APR credential.

Certification process

APR credential
The Accredited in Public Relations (APR) certification is designed for public relations professionals with a recommended (not required) five or more years of industry experience, and who possess an undergraduate university degree or higher. To earn the APR, candidates first must be members in good standing of a UAB member organization and submit an application with APR fee. Once the application is approved, the candidate completes a written series of questions detailing their professional background and experience. The candidate is then interviewed by a panel of three current PR practitioners who hold the APR certification, during which time a portfolio of the candidate's past work is presented and reviewed, along with the candidate's detailed questionnaire. This oral component is referred to as the "panel presentation" The final element is a computer-based Examination covering key concepts in PR planning, relationship management, communications theory, legal issues, and professional ethics. Testing is administered by Prometric. Once granted, the certification is retained for life, contingent on completion of regular continuing education activities, and current membership in a UAB member organization.

APR+M credential
The Accredited in Public Relations and Military Communications (APR+M) certification is designed for members of the United States armed forces and civilian employees of the United States Department of Defense, who have a recommended (not required) five or more years of experience in public affairs, and who possess an undergraduate university degree or higher. Written submission, oral presentation, and testing requirements are essentially similar to those required for the APR, however, examiners are drawn from APR+Ms and the computer-based Examination uses a unique set of questions specific to military communications. In addition, the oral presentation ("panel presentation") is offered via telephone or video conference to military personnel who are deployed overseas. Unlike the APR, membership in a UAB member organization is not a prerequisite to earn or maintain the APR+M, however, ongoing continuing education is required to maintain the currency of the certification.

Certificate in Principles of Public Relations
Beginning in 2013, a certification called the "Certificate in Principles of Public Relations" has been offered by the UAB as an entry-level credential for those entering the PR field. The certificate is designed for university students within six months of graduating (before or after) in a degree-granting program in public relations. Candidates must have student-class membership in a UAB member organization, take a university-sponsored or online preparatory course, and pass a computer-based Examination on principles and theory of public relations. Twenty-four U.S. universities currently offer the preparatory course, with more joining every year.

Universal Accreditation Board
The Universal Accreditation Board, which administers the APR, APR+M, and Certificate in Principles of Public Relations, is composed of approximately 25 public relations educators and practitioners appointed by the nine major public relations professional associations: 

 Asociación de Relacionistas Profesionales de Puerto Rico 
 California Association of Public Information Officials 
 Florida Public Relations Association 
 Maine Public Relations Council 
 National Association of Government Communicators 
 National School Public Relations Association 
 Public Relations Society of America (PRSA) 
 Religion Communicators Council 
 Southern Public Relations Federation

See also
Professional certification
List of professional designations in the United States

External links 
 Accreditation in Public Relations
 Universal Accreditation Board
 50th Anniversary of the APR, a timeline of historical milestones
 White paper: Accreditation in Public Relations (50th anniversary review, 2014)

References

Public relations
Accreditation